Mark Lane is a street in the City of London linking Great Tower Street and Fenchurch Street. It gave its name to the nearby Mark Lane tube station, which was opened in 1884, renamed Tower Hill in 1964, and closed three years later. For some 240 years, Mark Lane was known for the Corn Exchange (which was the only market in London for corn, grain and seed); it occupied a series of properties on the east side of the southern end of the street.

Description

At its northern end, Mark Lane originates as a two-way side-road off Fenchurch Street, leading to Dunster Court, the home of the Worshipful Company of Clothworkers since 1456. From the south, it is a one-way turn off Great Tower Street; the one-way stretch ends at London Street.

The street plays host to a number of offices and restaurants. The nearest London Underground station is Tower Hill (Circle and District lines) and the nearest mainline railway station is Fenchurch Street (with services towards east London and Essex).

Near the northern end of the lane stood the medieval Church of All Hallows Staining, which was demolished in 1870 when its parish was united with nearby St Olave's Church, Hart Street. Only the 12th or 13th century bell tower survives at the junction with Dunster Court. It is a Grade I listed building.

According to the antiquarian John Stow, writing at the end of the 16th century, the name of the lane is derived from a former cattle market or "mart" once held there.

Corn exchanges

In the nineteenth century 'Mark Lane' was a metonym for London's corn and grain markets. The first Corn Exchange opened on Mark Lane in 1747, bringing together the various agents who sold oats, beans and all kinds of grain on behalf of the farmers. (Corn, brought by river into the city, was customarily landed at Bear Quay, not far from the Exchange). The Corn Exchange, designed by George Dance the Elder in the classical style, was built around a courtyard which was open to the sky. The courtyard was surrounded by stalls or counters at which samples were available of the goods being traded. Either side of the Exchange were coffee-houses, where further business was transacted.

In 1826 a rival exchange was set up by a group of discontented traders (the London Corn Exchange). Permission having been granted by Parliament, they established their 'new' exchange, also in Mark Lane, immediately alongside the 'old'; it was designed, in the Greek style, by George Smith and opened in 1828. In 1882, the 'Old Exchange' was largely demolished and replaced by a far larger building (designed by Edward I'Anson) in the Italianate style.

Both exchanges continued in operation until they were amalgamated in 1926. Smith's 'New Exchange' was demolished five years later; ten years after that, I'Anson's 1882 Corn Exchange was destroyed in the Blitz. Its replacement, by Terence Heysham, was opened in 1952 (its operation funded in part by the commercial letting of an eight-storey office block built as part of the design). Twenty years later it too was demolished and rebuilt; but the Corn Exchange continued trading 'cereals of every kind, pulse vegetables, flour, seeds, animal feeds and fertilisers'.

After several years' decline in trading the Corn Exchange building on Mark Lane closed in 1987; at the same time the market, and its remaining traders, relocated to the Baltic Exchange in St Mary Axe. The name 'Corn Exchange' is preserved in the name of the building at number 55, Mark Lane.

In popular culture

Dornford Yates used Mark Lane as a setting for some of the action in his 1939 thriller, Gale Warning. It is the location of the fictitious "City Conservative Club".

Notable people
 Thomas Boddington, slave-owner and philanthropist, who shared an office in Mark Lane with his brother Benjamin in the 18th century
 Alexander Ellice (slave trader) established an office in Mark Lane

See also
Corn exchanges in England
Eastcheap
Thames Street

References

Streets in the City of London